The Mazum Dam (alternatively Mazam) is located near Modasa, Gujarat in India. it is built on small river called Mazum which may the reason it has been named as Mazum dam. it is located in Aravalli District of Gujarat near Modasa town. it is about 9 km away from modasa. This dam supplies water, allowing farmers to harvest their crops and is also used when nearby towns are running out of water.

References

Dams in Gujarat
Sabarkantha district
Aravalli district
Masonry dams
Reservoirs in India
Gravity dams
1984 establishments in Gujarat
Dams completed in 1984
20th-century architecture in India